How We Operate is the fifth studio album by the English indie rock band Gomez released in May 2006 by ATO Records. Production on the album was overseen by the band as well as Gil Norton, known for his work on albums by artists such as Pixies, Foo Fighters and Pere Ubu. Recorded at RAK Studios in London, How We Operate received generally favourable reviews from music critics.

Track listing
"Notice" – 4:01
"See the World" – 4:03
"How We Operate" – 5:26
"Hamoa Beach" – 3:34
"Girlshapedlovedrug" – 4:00
"Chasing Ghosts with Alcohol" – 3:42
"Tear Your Love Apart" – 4:06
"Charley Patton Songs" – 5:13
"Woman! Man!" – 4:05
"All Too Much" – 4:33
"Cry on Demand" – 4:22
"Don't Make Me Laugh" – 4:34

References

External links
 How We Operate on ATO Records
 
 Gomez the band
 'See the world' song of the day on thishereboogie.com 2 December 2008

2006 albums
Gomez (band) albums
ATO Records albums
Albums produced by Gil Norton
Albums recorded at RAK Studios